Chukhverkent is a rural locality (a selo) in Novomakinsky Selsoviet, Suleyman-Stalsky District, Republic of Dagestan, Russia. The population was 898 as of 2010. There are 9 streets.

Geography 
Novaya Maka is the nearest rural locality.

References 

Rural localities in Suleyman-Stalsky District